Curvus may refer to:
 Curvus (fly), a genus of flies in the family Dolichopodidae
 Curvus, Roman cognomen
 Marcus Fulvius Curvus Paetinus, Roman suffect consul 
 Lucius Fulvius Curvus, Roman consul